Ruth Wilson  (born 13 January 1982) is an English actress. She is known for her performances as the eponymous protagonist in Jane Eyre (2006), as Alice Morgan in the BBC psychological crime drama Luther (2010–2013, 2019), as Alison Lockhart in the Showtime drama The Affair (2014–2018), and as the eponymous character in Mrs Wilson (2018). Since 2019, she has portrayed Marisa Coulter in the BBC/HBO fantasy series His Dark Materials, and for this role she won the 2020 BAFTA Cymru Award for Best Actress. Her film credits include The Lone Ranger (2013), Saving Mr. Banks (2013), I Am the Pretty Thing That Lives in the House (2016), and Dark River (2017).

Wilson is a three-time Olivier Award nominee and two-time winner, earning the Best Actress for the titular role in Anna Christie, and the Best Supporting Actress for her portrayal of Stella Kowalski in A Streetcar Named Desire. She is also a two-time Tony Award nominee for her performances in Constellations and King Lear on Broadway. She has won a Golden Globe for her role in The Affair and received nominations for a British Academy Television Award for Best Actress and a Golden Globe Award for Best Actress – Television Series Drama for the title role in Jane Eyre.

Early life 
Wilson was born in Ashford, the daughter of Nigel Wilson, an investment banker, and wife, Mary Metson, a probation officer. She has three older brothers: Tobias "Toby" Wilson, Samuel "Sam" Wilson (a BBC journalist), and Matthew Wilson. She is the granddaughter of novelist and MI6 officer Alexander Wilson and his third, bigamously-married, wife, Alison (née McKelvie). Her paternal great-grandmother was Irish. Wilson grew up in Shepperton, Surrey, and was raised as a Catholic.

She attended Notre Dame School, an independent Catholic school for girls located in Cobham, before attending sixth form at Esher College. As a teenager, she worked as a model. She studied History at the University of Nottingham, and while there was also involved in student drama at the Nottingham New Theatre. She graduated from Nottingham in 2003 and from the London Academy of Music and Dramatic Art (LAMDA) in July 2005. Afterwards, she co-founded Hush Productions. During her time at Nottingham, she participated in the TV war strategy game Time Commanders, helping her teammates fight in the Battle of Pharsalus.

Career 
Prior to her role in Jane Eyre, Wilson had one professional screen credit, in Suburban Shootout, a situation comedy she appeared in with Tom Hiddleston. In 2006–2007, she filmed the second series of Suburban Shootout, a new Agatha Christie's Marple mystery (Nemesis) for ITV, and Stephen Poliakoff's BBC television drama Capturing Mary as the young Mary.

Wilson appeared in Gorky's Philistines in 2007, playing Tanya, at the Royal National Theatre from May until August. In June, she presented the 2007 Lilian Baylis Awards. Other projects in 2007 included a guest appearance in the sitcom Freezing as Alison Fennel (transmitted on BBC2, 21 February 2008); narration of the documentary The Polish Ambulance Murders (transmitted on BBC4, 5 February 2008); and the portrayal of a mentally ill doctor in the dramatised documentary The Doctor Who Hears Voices (transmitted on UK Channel 4, 21 April 2008).

From 23 July to 3 October 2009, she appeared as Stella in the Donmar Warehouse revival of A Streetcar Named Desire. On 15 November 2009 AMC Television and ITV premiered the 2009 TV miniseries remake of The Prisoner, in which Wilson played the Village doctor, "No. 313". She played "Queenie" in an adaptation of Andrea Levy's Small Island, which aired on BBC1 in December 2009 and also aired in the United States on PBS in 2010.

Since 2010, she has appeared in the British psychological police drama Luther as Alice Morgan, a research scientist and highly intelligent individual described by Luther as a narcissist. In September 2012, the series' creator, Neil Cross, announced that he was in the process of creating a spin-off of Luther centred on Wilson's character, though as of 2018 this has not happened. Cross stated, "The BBC is very interested in the project. The only real question would be how many and how often we would do it – whether it would be a one-off miniseries or a returning miniseries, a co-production or not." While Wilson could not appear in series four of Luther due to filming clashing with The Affair, she returned for series five.

From 4 August to 8 October 2011, Wilson starred in the title role of Eugene O'Neill's Anna Christie at the Donmar Warehouse alongside Jude Law. Her performance prompted The Guardian to devote an editorial to Wilson's "courageous, edgy and compelling talent".

In 2014, Wilson began starring as Alison Bailey on the drama television series The Affair, created by Sarah Treem and Hagai Levi. She won the Golden Globe Award for Best Actress – Television Series Drama in January 2015 for her performance in the series' first season. She departed the series in 2018 after four seasons. It was reported in December 2019 that Wilson's departure was due to "frustrations with the nudity required of her, friction with Treem over the direction of her character, and what she ultimately felt was a 'hostile work environment'".

Wilson made her Broadway debut in Constellations, a play written by Nick Payne, at the Samuel J. Friedman Theatre. She starred alongside Jake Gyllenhaal throughout the play's run from 12 January to 14 March 2015. She received a Tony Award nomination for Best Actress in a Play for her performance.

Her film I Am the Pretty Thing That Lives in the House, directed by Oz Perkins, premiered at the 2016 Toronto International Film Festival. From December 2016 to February 2017, Wilson starred in the title role of Hedda Gabler in a new version by Patrick Marber at the Royal National Theatre. The production, and Wilson's performance in particular, received critical acclaim.

In November 2018, Wilson starred as the title character Alison Wilson—her real-life grandmother—in the BBC drama Mrs Wilson. Alison Wilson was the third of four wives of former MI6 officer and novelist Alexander Wilson. They were married for 22 years. After his death in 1963, Alison discovered another wife of her husband's, with whom she eventually collaborated on the funeral. In order not to create extra shock for his children, the other wife and her children attended the funeral as 'distant relatives'. 

Alison died in 2005 without knowing he had had two further wives. Ruth Wilson explains in a December 2018 Radio Times interview that the script for the series that showed Alison uncovering all of the wives was dramatised to reveal the full story during the series. She was also an executive producer for the series.

In October 2020, Wilson won the BAFTA Cymru Award for Best Actress for her portrayal of Marisa Coulter in His Dark Materials. In November 2020, it was announced that she would be starring as Norwegian diplomat Mona Juul in a filmed version of J. T. Rogers' Tony Award-winning play Oslo.

Wilson was appointed Member of the Order of the British Empire (MBE) in the 2021 Birthday Honours for services to drama.

Filmography

Film

Television

Theatre

Radio

Awards and nominations

References

External links 

 

1982 births
Living people
Actresses from Surrey
Alumni of the London Academy of Music and Dramatic Art
Alumni of the University of Nottingham
Audiobook narrators
Best Drama Actress Golden Globe (television) winners
English people of Irish descent
English people of Scottish descent
English radio actresses
English stage actresses
English television actresses
English voice actresses
Laurence Olivier Award winners
Members of the Order of the British Empire
People educated at Notre Dame School, Surrey
People from Ashford, Surrey
People from Shepperton
Theatre World Award winners
21st-century English actresses